The Battle of the Golden Spurs was a military confrontation between the royal army of France and rebellious forces of the County of Flanders on 11 July 1302 during the Franco-Flemish War (1297–1305). It took place near the town of Kortrijk (Courtrai) in modern-day Belgium and resulted in an unexpected victory for the Flemish. It is sometimes referred to as the Battle of Courtrai.

On 18 May 1302, after two years of French military occupation and several years of unrest, many cities in Flanders revolted against French rule, and the local militia massacred many Frenchmen in the city of Bruges. King Philip IV of France immediately organized an expedition of 8,000 troops, including 2,500 men-at-arms, under Count Robert II of Artois to put down the rebellion. Meanwhile, 9,400 men from the civic militias of several Flemish cities were assembled to counter the expected French attack.

When the two armies met outside the city of Kortrijk on 11 July, the cavalry charges of the mounted French men-at-arms proved unable to defeat the mail-armoured and well-trained Flemish militia infantry's pike formation. The result was a rout of the French nobles, who suffered heavy losses at the hands of the Flemish. The 500 pairs of spurs that were captured from the French horsemen gave the battle its popular name.  The battle was a famous early example of an all-infantry army overcoming an army that depended on the shock attacks of heavy cavalry.

While France was victorious in the overall Franco-Flemish War, the Battle of the Golden Spurs became an important cultural reference point for the Flemish Movement during the 19th and 20th centuries. In 1973, the date of the battle was chosen for the official holiday of the Flemish Community in Belgium.

A 1985 film called De leeuw van Vlaanderen (The Lion of Flanders) shows the battle, and the politics that led up to it.

Background
The origins of the Franco-Flemish War (1297–1305) can be traced back to the accession of Philip IV "the Fair" to the French throne in 1285. Philip hoped to reassert control over the County of Flanders, a semi-independent polity notionally part of the Kingdom of France, and possibly even to annex it into the crown lands of France. In the 1290s, Philip attempted to gain support from the Flemish aristocracy and succeeded in winning the allegiance of some local notables, including John of Avesnes (Count of Hainaut, Holland and Zeeland). He was opposed by a faction led by the Flemish knight Guy of Dampierre who attempted to form a marriage alliance with the English against Philip. In Flanders, however, many of the cities were split into factions known as the "Lilies" (Leliaerts), who were pro-French, and the "Lions" (Liebaards), who would later be called "Claws" (Klauwaerts), led by Pieter de Coninck in Bruges, who advocated independence.

In June 1297, the French invaded Flanders and gained some rapid successes. The English, under Edward I, withdrew to face a war with Scotland, and the Flemish and French signed a temporary armistice in 1297, the Truce of Sint-Baafs-Vijve, which halted the conflict. In January 1300, when the truce expired, the French invaded Flanders again, and by May, were in total control of the county. Guy of Dampierre was imprisoned and Philip himself toured Flanders making administrative changes.

After Philip left Flanders, unrest broke out again in the Flemish city of Bruges directed against the French governor of Flanders, Jacques de Châtillon. On 18 May 1302, rebellious citizens who had fled Bruges returned to the city and murdered every Frenchman they could find, an act known as the Bruges Matins. With Guy of Dampierre still imprisoned, command of the rebellion was taken by John and Guy of Namur. Most of the towns of the County of Flanders agreed to join the Bruges rebellion except for the city of Ghent which refused to take part. Most of the Flemish nobility also took the French side, fearful of what had become an attempt to take power by the lower classes.

Forces
In order to quell the revolt, Philip sent a powerful force led by Count Robert II of Artois to march on Bruges. Against the French, the Flemish under William of Jülich fielded a largely infantry force which was drawn mainly from Bruges, West Flanders, and the east of the county. The city of Ypres sent a contingent of five hundred men under Jan van Renesse, and despite their city's refusal to join the revolt, Jan Borluut arrived with seven hundred volunteers from Ghent.

The Flemish were primarily town militia who were well equipped and trained. The militia fought primarily as infantry, were organized by guild, and were equipped with steel helmets, mail haubergeons, spears, pikes, bows, crossbows and the goedendag. All Flemish troops at the battle had helmets, neck protection, iron or steel gloves and effective weapons, though not all could afford mail armor. The goedendag was a specifically Flemish weapon, made from a thick -long wooden shaft and topped with a steel spike. They were a well-organized force of 8,000–10,000 infantry, as well as four hundred noblemen, and the urban militias of the time prided themselves on their regular training and preparation. About 900 of the Flemish were crossbowmen. The Flemish militia formed a line formation against cavalry with goedendags and pikes pointed outward. Because of the high rate of defections among the Flemish nobility, there were few mounted knights on the Flemish side. The Annals of Ghent claimed that there were just ten cavalrymen in the Flemish force.

The French, by contrast, fielded a royal army with a core of 2,500 noble cavalry, including knights and squires, arrayed into ten formations of 250 armored horsemen. During the deployment for the battle, they were arranged into three battles, of which the first two were to attack and the third to function as a rearguard and reserve. They were supported by about 5,500 infantry, a mix of crossbowmen, spearmen, and light infantry. The French had about 1,000 crossbowmen, most of whom were from the Kingdom of France and perhaps a few hundred were recruited from northern Italy and Spain. Contemporary military theory valued each knight as equal to roughly ten footmen.

The Battle

The combined Flemish forces met at Kortrijk on 26 June and laid siege to the castle, which housed a French garrison. As the siege was being laid, the Flemish leaders began preparing a nearby field for battle. The size of the French response was impressive, with 3,000 knights and 4,000–5,000 infantry being an accepted estimate. The Flemish failed to take the castle and the two forces clashed on 11 July in an open field near the city next to the Groeninge stream.

The field near Kortrijk was crossed by numerous ditches and streams dug by the Flemish as Philip's army assembled. Some drained from the river Leie (or Lys), while others were concealed with dirt and tree branches, making it difficult for the French cavalry to charge the Flemish lines. The marshy ground also made the cavalry less effective. The French sent servants to place wood in the streams, but they were attacked before they completed their task. The Flemish placed themselves in a strong defensive position, in deeply stacked lines forming a square. The rear of the square was covered by a curve of the river Leie. The front presented a wedge to the French army and was placed behind larger rivulets.

The 1,000 French crossbowmen attacked their 900 Flemish counterparts and succeeded in forcing them back. Eventually, the French crossbow bolts and arrows began to hit the main Flemish infantry formations' front ranks but inflicted little damage.

The French commander Robert of Artois was worried the outnumbered French foot would be attacked from all sides by superior, heavily armed Flemish infantry on the other side of the brooks. Furthermore, the Flemish would then have their formations right on edge of the brooks and a successful French cavalry crossing would be extremely difficult. He therefore recalled his foot soldiers to clear the way for 2,300 heavy cavalry arranged into two attack formations. The French cavalry unfurled their banners and advanced on the command "Forward!".

Some of the French footmen were trampled to death by the armoured cavalry, but most managed to get back around them or through the gaps in their lines. The cavalry advanced rapidly across the streams and ditches to give the Flemish no time to react. The brooks presented difficulties for the French horsemen and a few fell from their steeds. Despite initial confusion, the crossing was successful in the end. The French reorganized their formations on the other side to maximize their effectiveness in battle.

Ready for combat, the French knights and men-at-arms charged at a quick trot and with their lances ready against the main Flemish line. The Flemish crossbowmen and archers fell back behind the pikemen. A great noise rose throughout the dramatic battle scene. The disciplined Flemish foot-soldiers kept their pikes ready on the ground and their goedendags raised to meet the French charge. The Flemish infantry wall did not flinch and a part of the French cavalry hesitated. The bulk of the French formations carried on their forward momentum and fell on the Flemish in an ear-splitting crash of horses against men. Unable at most points to break the Flemish line of pikemen, many French knights were knocked from their horses and killed with the goedendag, the spike of which was designed to penetrate the spaces between armour segments. Those cavalry groups that succeeded in breaking through were set upon by the reserve lines, surrounded and wiped out.

To turn the tide of the battle, Artois ordered his rearguard of 700 men-at-arms to advance, joining the battle personally with his own knights and with trumpets blaring. The rearguard did not attack the Flemish however, remaining stationary after its initial advance to protect the French baggage train. Artois' charge routed some of the Flemish troops under Guy of Namur, but could not break the entire Flemish formation. Artois' men-at-arms were attacked by fresh Flemish forces and the French fought back with desperate courage, aware of the danger they were in. Artois defended himself skillfully. His horse was struck down by a lay brother, Willem van Saeftinghe, and the count himself was killed, covered with multiple wounds. According to some tales, he begged for his life, but the Flemish refused to spare him, claiming that they did not understand French.

When ultimately the French knights became aware that they could no longer be reinforced, their attacks faltered and they were gradually driven back into the rivulet marshes. There, disorganized, unhorsed, and encumbered by the mud, they were an easy target for the heavily armed Flemish infantry. A desperate charge by the French garrison in the besieged castle was thwarted by a Flemish contingent specifically placed there for that task. The French infantry was visibly shaken by the sight of their knights being slaughtered and withdrew from the rivulets. The Flemish front ranks then charged forward, routing their opponents, who were massacred. Unusually for the period, the Flemish infantry took few if any of the French knights prisoner for ransom, in revenge for the French "cruelty".

The Annals of Ghent concludes its description of the battle:

Aftermath

With the French army defeated, the Flemish consolidated control over the County. Kortrijk castle surrendered on 13 July and John of Namur entered Ghent on 14 July and the "patrician" regime in the city and in Ypres were overthrown and replaced by more representative regimes. Guilds were also officially recognised.

The battle soon became known as the Battle of the Golden Spurs, after the 500 pairs of spurs that were captured in the battle and offered at the nearby Church of Our Lady. After the Battle of Roosebeke in 1382, the spurs were taken back by the French and Kortrijk was sacked by Charles VI in retaliation.

According to the Annals, the French lost more than 1,000 men during the battle, including 75 important nobles. These included:
 Robert II, Count of Artois and his half-brother James
 Raoul of Clermont-Nesle, Lord of Nesle, Constable of France
 Guy I of Clermont, Lord of Breteuil, Marshal of France
 Simon de Melun, Lord of La Loupe and Marcheville, Marshal of France
 John I of Ponthieu, Count of Aumale
 John II of Trie, Count of Dammartin
 John II of Brienne, Count of Eu
 John of Avesnes, Count of Ostrevent, son of John II, Count of Holland
 Godfrey of Brabant, Lord of Aarschot and Vierzon, and his son John of Vierzon
 Jacques de Châtillon, Lord of Leuze
 Pierre de Flotte, Chief Advisor to Philip IV the Fair
 Raoul de Nesle, son of John III, Count of Soissons.

The Flemish victory at Kortrijk in 1302 was quickly reversed by the French. In 1304, the French destroyed the Flemish fleet at the Battle of Zierikzee and fought the Flemish at the battle at Mons-en-Pévèle. In June 1305, negotiations between the two sides led to the Peace of Athis-sur-Orge in which the Flemish were forced to pay the French substantial tribute. Robert of Béthune subsequently lost against the French between 1314 and 1320.

The town of Kortrijk hosts many monuments and a museum dedicated to the battle.

Historical significance

Effect on warfare
The Battle of the Golden Spurs had been seen as the first example of the gradual "Infantry Revolution"  in Medieval warfare across Europe during the 14th century. Conventional military theory placed emphasis on mounted and heavily armoured knights which were considered essential to military success. Infantry remained, however, an essential arm in parts of Europe, such as the British Isles, throughout the Middle Ages. This meant that warfare was the preserve of a wealthy elite of bellatores (nobles specialized in warfare) serving as men-at-arms. The fact that this form of army, which was expensive to maintain, could be defeated by militia drawn from the "lower orders" led to a gradual change in the nature of warfare during the subsequent century. The tactics and composition of the Flemish army at Courtrai were later copied or adapted at the battles of Bannockburn (1314), Crecy (1346), Aljubarrota (1385), Sempach (1386), Agincourt (1415), Grandson (1476) and in the battles of the Hussite Wars (1419–34). As a result, cavalry became less important and nobles more commonly fought dismounted. The comparatively low costs of militia armies allowed even small states (such as the Swiss) to raise militarily significant armies and meant that local rebellions were more likely to achieve military success.

In Flemish culture and politics
Interest in medieval history in Belgium emerged during the 19th century alongside the rise of Romanticism in art and literature. According to the historian Jo Tollebeek, it soon became connected to nationalist ideals because the Middle Ages were "a period that could be linked with the most important contemporary aspirations" of romantic nationalism.

Amid that resurgence, the Battle of the Golden Spurs became the subject of an "extensive cult" in 19th- and 20th-century Flanders. After Belgian independence in 1830, the Flemish victory was interpreted as a symbol of local pride. The battle was painted in 1836 by a leading Romanticist painter Nicaise de Keyser. Probably inspired by the painting, the Flemish writer Hendrik Conscience used it as the centerpiece of his classic 1838 novel, The Lion of Flanders which brought the events to a mass audience for the first time. It inspired an engraving by the artist James Ensor in 1895. A large monument and triumphal arch were also subsequently erected on the site of the battle between 1906 and 1908. The battle was evoked by King Albert I at the start of World War I to inspire bravery among Flemish soldiers as an equivalent of the Walloon six hundred Franchimontois of 1468. In 1914, the Belgian victory against German cavalry at the Battle of Halen was dubbed the "Battle of the Silver Helmets" in analogy to the Golden Spurs. Its anniversary, 11 July, became an important annual Flemish observance. In 1973, the date was formalised as the official holiday of the Flemish Community.

As the Battle of the Golden Spurs became an important part of Flemish identity, it became increasingly important within the Flemish Movement. Emerging in the 1860s, it sought autonomy or even independence for Flemish (Dutch)-speaking Flanders and became increasingly radical after World War I. The battle was seen as a "milestone" in a historic struggle for Flemish national liberation and a symbol of resistance to foreign rule. Flemish nationalists wrote poems and songs about the battle and celebrated its leaders. As a result of that linguistic-based nationalism, the contribution of French-speaking soldiers and command of the battle by the Walloon noble Guy of Namur was neglected.

References

Sources

Further reading

External links

 Liebaart.org 

Battles of the Middle Ages
14th century in the county of Flanders
Battle of the Golden Spurs
Battles involving Flanders
Battles involving France
Battles in Flanders
1302 in Europe
1300s in France
Conflicts in 1302
Franco-Flemish War